Stefan Mrożewski (12 April 1894 – 8 September 1975) was a Polish painter. His work was part of the painting event in the art competition at the 1936 Summer Olympics. His work included wood engravings, book illustrations, portraits and town landscapes.

References

1894 births
1975 deaths
20th-century Polish painters
20th-century Polish male artists
Olympic competitors in art competitions
People from Częstochowa
Polish male painters